Milan Konjević (born 1970, in Belgrade), is a Serbian film director, screenwriter and comics writer.

Filmography
Zone of the Dead (2009)

External links

Serbian film directors
Serbian screenwriters
Male screenwriters
Serbian comics writers
1970 births
Living people
Date of birth missing (living people)
University of Belgrade Faculty of Dramatic Arts alumni